Coupelle-Vieille is a commune in the Pas-de-Calais department in the Hauts-de-France region of France.

Geography
Coupelle-Vieille is situated some 16 miles (26 km) northeast of Montreuil-sur-Mer on the D343 road.

Population

See also
Communes of the Pas-de-Calais department

References

Coupellevieille
Artois